Evgen Sajovic (25 November 1913 - 1986) was a Slovene painter, also known for his frescos and sgraffito as well as book illustrations.

Sajovic was born in Ljubljana in 1913. He studied art at the Zagreb Academy of Fine Arts under Marino Tartaglia and graduated in 1938.

He won the Levstik Award in 1953 for his illustrations of Andersen's Snow Queen and other stories (Slovene title: Snežna kraljica in druge pravljice).

In 1979 he also won the Prešeren Foundation Award for his artistic achievements.

References

Slovenian male painters
Slovenian illustrators
1913 births
1986 deaths
Levstik Award laureates
Artists from Ljubljana
Academy of Fine Arts, University of Zagreb alumni
20th-century Slovenian painters
20th-century Slovenian male artists
Yugoslav painters